Henry Cox Jones (January 23, 1821 – June 20, 1913) was an American politician who served as a Deputy from Alabama to the Provisional Congress of the Confederate States from April 1861 to February 1862.

Biography
Henry Cox Jones was born in Franklin County, Alabama, and later served as a state court judge in 1841, in the state house of representatives in 1842, and in the state senate in 1853. He was elected to the Provisional Congress of the Confederate States to replace Thomas Fearn and served in that capacity from April 1861 to February 1862.

References

External links

 
 Henry Cox Jones at The Political Graveyard

1821 births
1913 deaths
Alabama Secession Delegates of 1861
Alabama state court judges
Alabama state senators
Burials in Alabama
Deputies and delegates to the Provisional Congress of the Confederate States
Members of the Alabama House of Representatives
People from Franklin County, Alabama
19th-century American judges